The Sniffen Court Historic District is a small close-ended mews, running perpendicularly southwest from East 36th Street, between Third and Lexington Avenues in the Murray Hill neighborhood of Manhattan in New York City. The district, one of the smallest in New York City, encompasses the entire alley, which consists of 10 two-story brick stables built in 1863-1864 in the early Romanesque Revival style. The New York City Landmarks Preservation Commission designated Sniffen Court as a city historic district on June 21, 1966, and the district was added to the National Register of Historic Places on November 28, 1973.

Description and history
Sniffen Court may have been named after John Sniffen, a local builder, although The New York Times could not find evidence of his involvement with the alley. As the need for carriage houses lessened, the buildings were converted for other uses.  In 1918, two of the stables (#1, also known as 150 East 36th Street, and #3) were bought by the Amateur Comedy Club, which has been in existence since 1884, to be their clubhouse and theatre; they remain that today. In the 1920s, the process of conversion continued, and by 1966 one of the buildings was in use as an architect's office, the gabled building at #2 (156 East 36th Street) was the home of a noted architect, while the remainder were small private residences.

Two artists associated with the mews were the sculptors Malvina Hoffman and Harriet Whitney Frishmuth, both of whom had studios in the Court. On the rear of the alley are mounted two sculpted plaques of Greek horsemen by Hoffman.

Notable people
Composer Cole Porter once owned a residence at 2 Sniffen Court as well as the townhouse next door at 4 Sniffen Court in order to discreetly put up his boyfriend at the time, all while he was in residence at the Waldorf-Astoria. In the 1930s, author Pearl Buck resided in what had been Hoffman's home. Also, legendary comedian Professor Irwin Corey owned a home on Sniffen Court for many years. Since then, the street has played host to model Claudia Schiffer,  Lenny Kravitz and, more recently, British talk show host Graham Norton.

In popular culture
Sniffen Court is used for the cover of the Strange Days album by The Doors, released in 1967.

Gallery

See also
List of New York City Designated Landmarks in Manhattan from 14th to 59th Streets
National Register of Historic Places listings in Manhattan from 14th to 59th Streets

References

External links

Carriage houses in the United States
Romanesque Revival architecture in New York City
Houses completed in 1864
Murray Hill, Manhattan
Historic districts on the National Register of Historic Places in Manhattan
Carriage houses on the National Register of Historic Places
Transportation buildings and structures on the National Register of Historic Places in New York City
Historic districts in Manhattan
New York City Designated Landmarks in Manhattan
New York City designated historic districts